Tadeusz Maciej Jaroszewski (1930–1988) is a Polish philosopher and religious studies Marxist professor of humanities, in the years 1976–1981 director of the Institute of Philosophy and Sociology PAN

Publications 
 Filozofia marksistowska. Podręcznik akademicki, Warszawa: Państ. Wydaw. Naukowe, 1975.
 Filozofia społeczna i doktryna polityczna Kościoła Katolickiego, Warszawa: Wyższa Szkoła Nauk Społecznych przy KC PZPR, 1965. 
 Filozoficzne problemy współczesnego chrześcijaństwa, Warszawa: Państwowe Wydawnictwo Naukowe, 1973. 
 Humanizm socjalistyczny (red.), Warszawa: "Książka i Wiedza", 1980.
 Kierunki walki o laicyzację życia społecznego w Polsce (tezy referatu), Warszawa: Zarząd Główny Towarzystwa Szkoły Świeckiej, 1961.
 Kościół a świat współczesny. Uwagi o soborowej konstytucji "Gaudium et spes", Warszawa: Centralny Ośrodek Doskonalenia Kadr Laickich, 1967.
 Laicyzacja, Warszawa: "Iskry", 1966. 
 Leninizm a problemy współczesnej filozofii, Warszawa: Polska Akademia Nauk, 1970. 
 Marksiści i katolicy. Perspektywy dialogu, Warszawa: "Książka i Wiedza", 1988.
 Osobowość i własność. Ideał struktury ekonomicznej i społecznej w ujęciu personalizmu neotomistycznego, Warszawa: "Książka i Wiedza", 1965. 
 Osobowość i wspólnota. Problemy osobowości we współczesnej antropologii filozoficznej, Warszawa: "Książka i Wiedza", 1970.
 Podstawy marksistowskiego światopoglądu : materiał pomocniczy dla Zespołów Kształcenia Ideologicznego, Warszawa: Książka i Wiedza, 1987.
 Problemy upowszechniania marksistowskiego poglądu na świat. Referat wygłoszony na VIII Plenum ZG TKKŚ, Kraków: Towarzystwo Krzewienia Kultury Świeckiej, 1977.
 Problemy upowszechnienia marksistowskiego poglądu na świat, Warszawa: Młodzieżowa Agencja Wydawnicza, 1977.
 Pytania i odpowiedzi : ideologia, polityka, gospodarka, handel zagraniczny, rolnictwo, sprawy międzynarodowe, [Warszawa]: "Książka i Wiedza", 1969. 
 Renesans scholastyki, jego źródła społeczne i intelektualne, Warszawa: "Książka i Wiedza", 1961. 
 Rozważania o praktyce : wokół interpretacji filozofii Karola Marksa, Warszawa: Państowe Wydawnictwo Naukowe, 1974.
 Słownik filozofii marksistowskiej, Warszawa: "Wiedza Powszechna", 1982. 
 Społeczno-ideologiczne aspekty rewolucji naukowo-technicznej, Gdańsk: Wojewódzki Ośrodek Propagandy Partyjnej przy KW PZPR, 1971. 
 Strukturalizm a marksizm, Warszawa: "Książka i Wiedza", 1969.
 Tradycje i współczesność klerykalizmu politycznego, Warszawa: TKKŚ, 1986.
 Traktat o naturze ludzkiej, Warszawa: "Książka i Wiedza", 1980. 
 Der "verlassene" Mensch Jean Paul Sartres, Berlin: Akad.- Verl., 1975. 
 Die wachsende Rolle der Arbeiterklasse in den sozialistischen Ländern, Berlin: Dietz, 1974.
 Wokół encykliki Populorum progressio, Warszawa: Centralny Ośrodek Doskonalenia Kadr Laickich, 1968.
 Wybrane problemy filozofii marksistowskiej. Zbiór opracowań, Warszawa: "Książka i Wiedza", 1972, 1973.
 Wybrane zagadnienia dialektyki marksistowskiej, Warszawa: Wyższa Szkoła Nauk Społecznych przy KC PZPR, 1960. 
 Wybrane zagadnienia dialektyki marksistowskiej. Skrypt wykładu, Warszawa: Wyższa Szkoła Nauk Społecznych przy KC PZPR, 1961

References 

1930 births
1988 deaths
20th-century Polish philosophers